was a town located in Kitamatsuura District, Nagasaki Prefecture, Japan.

On March 31, 2010, Emukae, along with the town of Shikamachi (also from Kitamatsuura District), was merged into the expanded city of Sasebo.

Emukae is most famous for its annual Sentoro Festival, which features a giant triangular frame bearing one thousand red lanterns. It is also the site of Senryugataki (Senryu Waterfall). 

The town has two pre-schools, a kindergarten, two elementary schools and one junior high school (middle school). It is approximately one hour's drive from the city hall of Sasebo, two hours from Nagasaki and about three hours from Fukuoka.

References

External links
 Sasebo official website 

Dissolved municipalities of Nagasaki Prefecture
Sasebo